The Catholic Bishops' Conference of Bangladesh is the episcopal conference of Bangladesh.

History

The CBCB was founded in 1971. The purpose of this Conference is to facilitate common policy and action in matters that affect or are liable to affect the interest of the Catholic Church in Bangladesh and to be of service to the country at large. Prior to the establishment of Bangladesh, the bishops of Bangladesh were members of the Catholic Bishops' Conference of Pakistan.

As of November 2013, the president of the Catholic Bishops' Conference of Bangladesh is Cardinal Patrick D’Rozario, the Archbishop of Dhaka.
The CBCB Center also use for meeting, conference with reasonable price. Bishop Moses Costa CSC of Chittagong diocese and Fr. Subrato Boniface Gomes took over the charge of CBCB Secretariat in July As Secretary General and Assistant Secretary General Respectively. Bikas Gomes is Manager for the CBCB center's conference room related activities.

See also
 Roman Catholicism in Bangladesh
 Christianity in Bangladesh

References

External links
 Official site
 GigaCatholic
 Pratibeshi, Bangladeshi Catholic weekly

Bangladesh
Catholic Church in Bangladesh
Christian organizations established in 1971